Lagerwall is a surname. Notable people with the surname include: 

Christina Lagerwall (born 1939), Swedish fencer
Guje Lagerwall (1918–2019), Swedish actress
Hans Lagerwall (1941–2022), Swedish fencer
Sture Lagerwall (1908–1964), Swedish actor and film director
Walborg Lagerwall (1851–1940), Swedish cellist